Gadikota Srikanth Reddy  is a Member of the Legislative Assembly (MLA) of Andhra Pradesh, a state in southern India. He was elected in the 2009 general assembly elections, when he defeated the sitting MLA. Reddy is a supporter of Y. S. Jagan Mohan Reddy, president of Yuvajana Sramika Rythu Congress Party.  Gadikota Srikanth Reddy is the Chief Whip in Andhra Pradesh State Legislative Assembly from 2019 and is now appointed as district president of Annamayya

His father, Gadikota Mohan Reddy, served as a MLA from the Lakkireddipalle constituency between 2004 and 2009.

In 2012, he resigned his membership in the Indian National Congress party and his membership in the Andhra Pradesh Legislative Assembly as a loyal gesture to popular leader, Y.S. Raja Shekara Reddy. He was re-elected to the Assembly on Yuvajana Sramika Rythu Congress Party ticket. He got a record majority of over 50,000 votes. Mr. Reddy represented Rayachoti as an MLA for three successive terms starting from 2009 to 2019.

On 1 April 2017, Reddy demanded that Tirupati be made the second capital of Andhra Pradesh. Gadikota Srikanth Reddy was appointed the chief whip of the Yuvajana Sramika Rythu Congress party led state government in Andhra Pradesh and now Appointed as district president of Annamayya.

References

Living people
YSR Congress Party politicians
Telugu politicians
1972 births
Andhra Pradesh MLAs 2019–2024